Mike Whalen (born November 4, 1960) is an American former college football coach. He was a collegiate wrestler and football player at Wesleyan University. He spent six years as the head football coach at Williams College, where he won four consecutive Little Three football championships. He was hired as the head football coach at Wesleyan in March 2010.

Athlete
A native of Enfield, Connecticut, Whalen attended Enrico Fermi High School. As a senior, he was the State Class "LL" Heavyweight Wrestling Champion and placed 3rd at the State Open Championships. For football Whalen was All-CCIL on both offense and defense and an All-State honorable mention. He took a postgraduate year at Loomis Chaffee, where he was the New England Prep Champion and 3rd in the National Prep Wrestling Championships while being named 1st team All-Prep and All-State in football. Whalen would go on to attend Wesleyan University in Middletown, Connecticut. He was a four-year starter as an offensive lineman for the Wesleyan Cardinals football team before receiving his degree in 1983. He was also the captain of the wrestling team at Wesleyan, earning All-New England and All-American honors three times. He was the first New England wrestler to win four consecutive New England championships.

Early coaching career
Whalen began his coaching career at Springfield College as a graduate assistant in football and wrestling. After receiving a master's degree from Springfield in Physical Education, Whalen was hired as an assistant football coach at the University of Pennsylvania and was on the coaching staff of the undefeated 1986 Penn team. He next worked as an assistant coach at Lafayette and Colgate University, holding the position of associate head coach at Colgate.

Williams
He was an assistant football coach at Williams College from 1996 to 2003, including three years as the team's offensive coordinator. While working as an assistant football coach, Whalen also served as the school's head wrestling coach from 1996 to 2004. In February 2004, he was hired as head football coach of the Williams Ephs, succeeding College Football Hall of Fame inductee, Dick Farley. Whalen served six years as Williams' head coach (2004–2009) during which he compiled a record of 38–10 (.792 winning percentage). In 2006, he led Williams to an undefeated, untied 8–0 record and the New England Small College Athletic Conference championship. He also led Williams to four consecutive Little Three championships from 2005 through 2008.

Wesleyan
While at Williams College, Whalen had an undefeated 6–0 record against his alma mater, Wesleyan. In March 2010, Wesleyan hired Whalen as its head football coach and assistant athletic director.  At the time, Whalen told reporters, "This would have never, ever, ever happened if I didn't go here. That was a big, big draw for me, to come home, to come back to Wesleyan and see if we can put this thing back on track." In his first year at Wesleyan, Whalen finished the year 4–4, losing close games to Middlebury, 24–21, and Trinity, 27–20, while also losing to Little Three rivals Williams and Amherst.

References

1960 births
Living people
American football offensive linemen
Colgate Raiders football coaches
Lafayette Leopards football coaches
Penn Quakers football coaches
Springfield Pride football coaches
Springfield Pride wrestling coaches
Wesleyan Cardinals football coaches
Wesleyan Cardinals football players
Wesleyan Cardinals wrestlers
Williams Ephs football coaches
Williams Ephs wrestling coaches
Loomis Chaffee School alumni
People from Enfield, Connecticut
Coaches of American football from Connecticut
Players of American football from Connecticut